Black Knife, Blackknife,  or black knife may refer to:

 Black Knife, Spanish name Dangerous Negro, Baishan (c. 1816 – 1857), a Chihenne (Mimbres) Apache chieftain involved in the Apache Wars.
Sgian-dubh ("black knife" or "hidden knife"), singled-edged knife, part of traditional Scottish Highland dress
Blackknife, a model of Modulus Guitars

See also
Caine Black Knife
Athame